The men's 4 × 400 metres relay event at the 1928 Olympic Games took place between August 4 and August 5.

Results

Heats

Heat 1

Key: Q = Qualified

Heat 2

Key: Q = Qualified

Heat 3

Key: Q = Qualified

Final

Key: WR = World record

References

Men's 4x400 metre relay
Relay foot races at the Olympics
Men's events at the 1928 Summer Olympics